Perleberg (North Margravian: Perlberg) is the capital of the district of Prignitz, located in the northwest of the German state of Brandenburg. The town received city rights in 1239 and today has about 12,000 inhabitants. Located in a mostly agricultural area, the town has a long history of troops (most notably Prussian) being stationed there and as an administrative center for local government.

Geography

Perleberg is located in the heart of the district of Prignitz, about halfway between the two largest German cities Berlin and Hamburg. It is surrounded by the municipalities Karstädt to the north-west, Gross Pankow (Prignitz) to the north-east, Plattenburg to the south-east; the Ämter Bad Wilsnack/Weisen in the south, Lenzen-Elbtalaue in the west; and the town of Wittenberge to the south-west.

The Stepenitz flows from northeast to southwest through Perleberg. The town's historic center is built on an island between two arms of the river.

History
One of the town's oldest buildings is St James's Church. First mentioned in 1294, it was frequently altered and extensively remodelled in the 1850s. In German, it is called the Jakobikirche, and therefore sometimes mistakenly called St Jacob's in English.

In the 14th century the town was at its height as part of the Hanseatic League. In 1523 it was the muster point for an army assembled by Elector Joachim I in support of his brother-in-law Christian II of Denmark's attempt to recover his throne. The Thirty Years' War caused serious damage to the town: of 3,500 inhabitants, only 300 survived. The mayor responsible for rebuilding the town after this period was Georg Krusemarck.

On November 25, 1809,  Benjamin Bathurst disappeared in Perleberg. Later accounts of the incident exaggerated the circumstances to such an extent that the disappearance is sometimes claimed to have been caused by paranormal phenomena.

Demography

Twin towns - sister cities 
Perleberg is twinned with:
 Kaarst, Germany
 Szczawnica, Poland

People 

 Lotte Lehmann, born here
 Dörte von Westernhagen, born here
 Ernst Ehrenbaum (1861–1942), biologist
 James Broh (1867–1942), lawyer, publicist and  politician

References

External links

Localities in Prignitz
Members of the Hanseatic League